Vadim Sharafidinovich Musaev (born 3 January 1993) is a Russian professional boxer. As an amateur he won a silver medal at the 2021 World Championships.
Since 2022, he has been training in Hollywood, Florida, US.

Amateur/Olympic career 
In February 2022, Vadim won the gold medal at the Strandzha Cup in Sofia.

References

External links 
Vadim Musaev the-sports.org
 

1993 births
Living people
Russian male boxers
AIBA World Boxing Championships medalists
Sportspeople from Makhachkala